Parapedobacter deserti is a Gram-negative, non-spore-forming, rod-shaped and non-motile  bacterium from the genus of Parapedobacter which has been isolated from the stem of the plant Haloxylon ammodendron.

References

External links
Type strain of Parapedobacter deserti at BacDive -  the Bacterial Diversity Metadatabase

Sphingobacteriia
Bacteria described in 2017